The 1978 Yale Bulldogs football team represented Yale University in the 1978 NCAA Division I-A football season.  The Bulldogs were led by 14th-year head coach Carmen Cozza, played their home games at the Yale Bowl and finished in third place in the Ivy League with a 4–1–2 record, 5–2–2 overall.

Schedule

References

Yale
Yale Bulldogs football seasons
Yale Bulldogs football